Gé Hurkmans (20 May 1911 – 11 August 1984) was a Dutch painter. His work was part of the painting event in the art competition at the 1936 Summer Olympics.

References

1911 births
1984 deaths
20th-century Dutch painters
Dutch male painters
Olympic competitors in art competitions
People from Tilburg
20th-century Dutch male artists